Oreichthys parvus is a small cyprinid fish found in southeastern Thailand, northern Malay Peninsula and Mekong basin in Laos and Thailand.

Description
O. parvus has numerous conspicuous rows of pores on the head, an incomplete lateral line perforating about 6 scales, a dark crescent-shaped mark at the base of each scale, a dark blotch at the base of the caudal fin, one at the tip of the dorsal fin and one along the anterior margin of the anal fin.

References

Cyprinid fish of Asia
Fish of Thailand
Oreichthys
Fish described in 1933